Yang Dong-Won is a South Korean retired football player who played as a goalkeeper.

References

External links 

1987 births
Living people
South Korean footballers
Daejeon Hana Citizen FC players
Suwon Samsung Bluewings players
Gangwon FC players
Gimcheon Sangmu FC players
Seongnam FC players
FC Anyang players
K League 1 players
K League 2 players
Association football goalkeepers